Arun Krishnan is an Indian writer based in New York City.

He is the author of The Loudest Firecracker, published by Tranquebar Press, a coming of age story set against the backdrop of communal tensions in urban India. He is also the host of the Learn Hindi from Bollywood Movies. India Style. podcast, the number one rated Indian podcast on iTunes.

References

External links
 The Learn Hindi from Bollywood Movies. India Style. podcast on CuttingChai.com

Writers from Delhi
Living people
Year of birth missing (living people)